The 6th Annual Juno Cup game took place at the UBC Thunderbird Arena on Friday 27 March 2009. That year NHL Greats such as Russ Courtnall, Brad Dalgarno, Mark Napier, Mike Pelyk, Bob Probert and Vancouver Canuck Cliff Ronning laced up against the Rockers. The Rockers gathered an enormous roster with artists such as Barenaked Ladies, Blue Rodeo, Great Big Sea, Kathleen Edwards and Sarah McLachlan.

Roster
NHLers:
Bob Probert
Brad Dalgarno
Cliff Ronning
Dave Babych
Garth Butcher
Gino Odjick
Greg Adams
Lanny McDonald
Mark Napier
Mike Pelyk
Russ Courtnall
Troy Crowder

Rockers:
Aaron Pritchett
Alan Doyle (Great Big Sea)
Barney Bentall
Brad Keller (Creaking Tree String Quartet)
Brian Kobayakawa (Creaking Tree String Quartet)
Cameron Melnyk (State of Shock)
Captain Scotty (Jeff O'Neil show on 99.3 The Fox)
Craig Northey (Odds)
Dustin Bentall
George Canyon
Jay Bodner (Eagle & Hawk)
Jesse Wainwright (State of Shock)
John Berry
Jim Cuddy(Blue Rodeo)
John Dinsmore (NQ Arbuckle & Kathleen Edwards)
Kathleen Edwards *
Kevin Parent
Luke Doucet
Mark Sasso (Elliott Brood)
Matthew Barber
Matt Johnson (54-40)
Michael Hollett
Paul Hawley (Hot Hot Heat)
Peter Kesper (NQ Arbuckle)
Rob Higgins (Dearly Beloved)
Sarah McLachlan (2009 Allan Waters Humanitarian Award)
Sean McCann (Great Big Sea)
Steve Dawson
Tyler Stewart (Barenaked Ladies)
Tyson Yerex (Acres of Lions)
Vince Fontaine (Eagle & Hawk)

References

External links
 Juno Cup official site

Juno Cup
Juno
Juno